La Ka Chau is a former island in Hong Kong. It is located in the northeastern part of Sai Kung. The island was connected to Sai Kung when the land reclamation was carried out in the area in the late 1970s and early 1980s to make the Sai Kung Waterfront. It is now part of a public car park in Sai Kung.

External links 
香港地方; 討論; 勒加洲 
 https://www.hkmaps.hk/map.html?1975
 https://www.hkmaps.hk/map.html?1970
 https://www.hkmaps.hk/map.html?1960

Islands of Hong Kong
Sai Kung Town